Changgeuk or ch'angguk is a traditional Korean opera, performed as a play but in the Korean folk song style known as pansori. It is therefore also called Korean pansori opera in English. Generally, a changgeuk play will include 20 to 30 actors, and 30 to 50 orchestra members.

An example
Suggungga (Mr. Rabbit and the Dragon King) tells a story about a shrewd rabbit who manages to return home safely using clever tricks after having visited the Dragon King's palace, which is located under the sea. The Dragon King had invited the rabbit to his palace to eat its liver after being told it that rabbit liver is the only cure for his illness. Sugungga is full of humor and also contains metaphors criticizing society.

See also
Pansori
Korean music
Korean theatre

External links

 https://web.archive.org/web/20060308175905/http://www.chosun.com/event/chunhyang/ennote.html

References

Korean art